Carpholite is a manganese silicate mineral with formula Mn2+Al2Si2O6(OH)4. It occurs as yellow clusters of slender prisms or needles. It crystallizes in the orthorhombic system.

The carpholite group includes ferrocarpholite, magnesiocarpholite, vanadiocarpholite, and potassiccarpholite.

Discovery and occurrence
It was first described in 1817 for an occurrence in Horní Slavkov (Schlaggenwald), Karlovy Vary Region, Bohemia. The name derives from Greek karfos for "straw" and lithos for "stone" due to its crystal habit.

Its typical occurrence is in shales that have undergone low grade metamorphism. Associated minerals include sudoite, manganoan garnet, chloritoid and fluorite.

References

Inosilicates
Orthorhombic minerals
Minerals in space group 68